Fuego ardiente (English: Burning Fire) is a Mexican telenovela that aired on Las Estrellas from 8 February 2021 to 4 June 2021. The series is produced by Carlos Moreno. It is an original story written by Martha Carrillo and Cristina García, and stars Mariana Torres, Carlos Ferro, Claudia Ramírez, and José María de Tavira.

Plot 
Dante (Fernando Ciangherotti) and Irene Ferrer (Claudia Ramírez) are owners of one of the most important and popular olive oil production companies in Mexico. Dante finds out that he suffers from ALS and decides to reunite the whole family knowing that he will soon die and feels the need to put all his issues in order and live with his family for the time that he has left, under the excuse of launching a new olive oil line. When the Ferrers reunite, a forbidden love is unleashed between Alexa (Mariana Torres) and Gabriel (Carlos Ferro). Both discover that behind the family business of olive oil production, hides the illegal activity of counterfeiting bills. Alexa is married to Joaquín Ferrer (Kuno Becker) and Gabriel is married to Martina Ferrer (Claudia Martín). Joaquín is the head of the illegal business and Gabriel is actually looking for his missing brother and believes that the Ferrers are behind his disappearance. Not all Ferrers are the same, Irene (Claudia Ramírez) is not like the rest of her family, she is a woman who fights for her physical and emotional independence, but breaks with traditions by falling in love with Fernando (José María de Tavira), a man younger than her.

Cast

Main 
 Mariana Torres as Alexa Gamba
 Claudia Ramírez as Irene Ferrer
 Carlos Ferro as Gabriel Montemayor
 José María de Tavira as Fernando Alcocer
 Claudia Martín as Martina Ferrer
 Kuno Becker as Joaquín Ferrer
 Arturo Peniche as Alfonso Juárez
 Laura Flores as Laura Urquidi
 Yolanda Ventura as Pilar Ortiz de Ferrer
 Fernando Ciangherotti as Dante Ferrer
 Luis Gatica as Nicolás
 Jaume Mateu as Rodrigo
 Bárbara Islas as Araceli
 Dayren Chávez as Cecilia
 Agustín Arana as Abel
 Socorro Bonilla as Soco
 José Elías Moreno as Father Mateo
 Odiseo Bichir as Heriberto
 Maya Ricote Rivero as Katia
 Sebastián Poza as Adriano Ferrer
 Candela Márquez as Tamara
 Chris Pascal as David
 Carlos Speitzer as Baldomero
 Christian Ramos as Tomás
 Andrea Fátima as Morales
 Luis José Sevilla as Negrete
 Daniel Martínez Campos as Gerardo
 Jorge Caballero as Solís
 Luz Edith Rojas as Caridad
 Carmen Delgado as Marcela
 Juan Luis Arias as Chaparro
 Medín Villatoro as Juan
 Said Sandoval as Chino
 Leo Casta as Ramiro
 Miranda Kay as Carmen

Recurring 
 Carmen Muga as Paulina
 Lorena Álvarez as Mercedes
 Felipe Carrera as Hernán
 Marco Uriel as Rubén Ferrer

Production 
The telenovela was announced on 15 October 2020 at Visión21 upfront. The main cast was revealed on 27 October 2020. Production began on 23 November 2020, and concluded in May 2021.

Ratings 
 
}}

Episodes

Notes

References

External links 
 

2021 telenovelas
2021 Mexican television series debuts
2021 Mexican television series endings
Televisa telenovelas
Spanish-language telenovelas
Mexican telenovelas